Nanqiao may refer to the following places in China.

Nanqiao, Liling, former town in Liling, Zhuzhou, Hunan
Nanqiao, Shanghai, town in Fengxian District, Shanghai
Nanqiao, Xingtang County, town in Xingtang County, Shijiazhuang, Hebei
Nanqiao District, district in Chuzhou, Anhui, China